Fair Glacier is an alpine glacier located just west of Apache Peak, in Roosevelt National Forest in the U.S. state of Colorado. The glacier is immediately west of the Continental Divide on the opposite side of the divide from Isabelle Glacier.

See also
List of glaciers in the United States

References

External links
 Fair Glacier on Summitpost

Glaciers of Colorado
Landforms of Grand County, Colorado